Journal of Volcanology and Geothermal Research is a scientific journal that publishes recent research on the fields of volcanology and geothermal activity, as well as the societal and environmental impact of these phenomenon.

Abstracting and indexing
This journal is abstracted and indexed by the following services:
 Chemical Abstracts
 Current Contents
 Engineering Index
 GEOBASE
 Mineralogical Abstracts
 Scopus
 GeoRef
 Science Citation Index 
 Referativnyi Zhurnal

See also 
 List of scientific journals
 List of scientific journals in earth and atmospheric sciences

References

Volcanology
Geophysics journals
Elsevier academic journals
Geology journals